Monte Santo may refer to the following places:

Monte Santo, Bahia, a municipality in Bahia, Brazil
Monte Santo de Minas, a municipality in Minas Gerais, Brazil
Monte Santo do Tocantins, a municipality in Tocantins, Brazil
Monte Santo (Siligo), a mountain in the region of Siligo, Sardinia, Italy